Gharewadi is a village in Maharashtra located West of the City Karad at distance of 12 km on Karad-Dhebewadi Road. This Village has a Janai devi temple and Dhuloba [Dhaleshwar|Dhuleshwar] temple situated on top of a hill near the village. This is one of the Family Gods for [Maratha] and  Dhangar Caste respectively in Maharashtra.

See also
Dhangar

References

Villages in Satara district